York Mills was a provincial riding in Ontario, Canada.  It was created prior to the 1963 provincial election from the northern part of York East and eliminated in 1996, when its territory was incorporated into the riding of Don Valley West.

Members of Provincial Parliament

Election results

References

Notes

Citations

Former provincial electoral districts of Ontario
Provincial electoral districts of Toronto